Château La Tour Carnet is a Bordeaux wine estate in the appellation Haut-Médoc. The wine produced here was classified as one of ten Quatrièmes Crus (Fourth Growths) in the historic Bordeaux Wine Official Classification of 1855, at the time known by the name of Carnet.

History
The estate has origins in the early Middle Ages, though the details are largely unknown, but takes its name from Jean Caranet or Carnet, an heir of Jean de Foix who is believed responsible for having built the château tower.

The estate has been owned by Bernard Magrez since 1999.

Production

There is typically produced  annually of the grand vin Château La Tour Carnet.

References

External links 
Château La Tour Carnet official site 

Bordeaux wine producers